Nkawkaw is a town in southern Ghana and is the capital of Kwahu East District, an area in the Eastern Region of south Ghana. Nkawkaw has a 2013 settlement population of 61,785 people. Nkawkaw is also described as a city in a valley as it the gateway to ascend the Kwahu mountains

Geography
Nkawkaw is situated on the road and former railway between Accra and Kumasi, and lies about halfway between these cities. It is also connected by road to Koforidua and Konongo. Nkawkaw is one of the major towns of the Kwahu Mountains. Historically it is not considered as a Kwahu town because it is not on top of the mountain range. According to the 2013 census Nkawkaw has a settlement population of 61,785.

Sports
Nkawkaw is the location of football team Okwawu United and is also the location of the Nkawkaw Park (stadium).

Accommodation
Nkawkaw has hotels with decent services, some of which includes Dubai City Hotel, Kwadisco Hotel, Rojo Hotel, Real Parker Hotel.

Health 

 Holy Family Hospital

Climate

Notable people
 George Boateng, football player
 Raphael Dwamena, football player
 Eric Darfour Kwakye, member of parliament

References

External links

Nkawkaw seen from space
    

Populated places in the Eastern Region (Ghana)